Córdoba is a town and municipality located in the Bolívar Department, northern Colombia.

In September, 2017, the community suffered 4.2 magnitude earthquake.

References

Municipalities of Bolívar Department